is a railway station in the city of Ōshū, Iwate Prefecture, Japan, operated by East Japan Railway Company (JR East).

Lines

Station layout
The station has an island platform and a single side platform, connected to the station building by a footbridge.  The station is staffed and has a Midori no Madoguchi staffed ticket office. The station is noted for the numerous nambu furin (wind chimes), and the station is listed as one of the 100 Soundscapes of Japan.

Platforms

History
Mizusawa station opened on 1 November 1890. The station was absorbed into the JR East network upon the privatization of the Japanese National Railways (JNR) on 1 April 1987.

Passenger statistics
In fiscal 2018, the station was used by an average of 1,859 passengers daily (boarding passengers only).

Surrounding area
Mizusawa Post office
Ōshū City Office
Kitakami River

See also
 List of Railway Stations in Japan

References

External links

  

Railway stations in Iwate Prefecture
Tōhoku Main Line
Railway stations in Japan opened in 1890
Ōshū, Iwate
Stations of East Japan Railway Company